Zoltán Füzesy (born 1 January 1961) is a Hungarian boxer. He competed in the men's middleweight event at the 1988 Summer Olympics.

References

External links
 

1961 births
Living people
Hungarian male boxers
Olympic boxers of Hungary
Boxers at the 1988 Summer Olympics
People from Kaposvár
AIBA World Boxing Championships medalists
Middleweight boxers
Sportspeople from Somogy County
20th-century Hungarian people